Dame Alice Owen's School  is a  partially selective secondary school and sixth form with academy status located in Potters Bar, Hertfordshire in southern England. The school was founded in Islington as a boys' school for 30 students in 1613, which makes the school one of the oldest in the United Kingdom. It is named after its founder, the 17th-century philanthropist Alice Owen. Over time, the boys' school expanded. A girls' school was built in 1886, and the two were merged into a mixed school in 1973; after this, the school moved to its current location gradually between 1973 and 1976.

Pupils
 Arthur Blok (1882–1974), English first administrative head of the Technion – Israel Institute of Technology
 Kacey Clarke, actress
 Suzanne Cox, TV presenter, Gladiator
 Gabrielle Jupp, Senior British Gymnastics Champion (2013)
 Paul Robinson, currently playing for AFC Wimbledon
 Fiona Wade, actress
 Al Fletcher, Drummer for the metal band Die So Fluid, Lee “Scratch” Perry, Jamaican reggae superstar (2003) and for ska legends The Selector.
 Jodie Williams, sprinter for Great Britain

Grammar schools in Islington
 Owen Aaronovitch, TV actor
 Joss Ackland, film actor
 Tony Ball, Chairman of Kabel Deutschland and Chief Executive of BSkyB, 1999–2003
 Ronald Chamberlain, Labour MP for Norwood, 1945–50
 Leslie Reginald Cox, palaeontologist
 Harold Darke, English composer and organist
 Edmund Dell, politician and businessman
 Florence Desmond, actress
 Chris Foreman, guitarist of the band Madness
 Gary Kemp, singer, songwriter, musician in new wave band Spandau Ballet and actor
 William Foyle, founder of Foyles bookshop [[
 Dame Mary Glen-Haig CBE, gold-medal-winning fencer at the 1950 and 1954 editions of the Commonwealth Games
 Prof Frederick Gugenheim Gregory, Professor of Plant Physiology, 1937–58 at Imperial College London
 Professor Sir Theodore Gregory, Professor of Economics at the London School of Economics
 Dame Beryl Grey CBE, Prima Ballerina, 1941–57 with the Sadler's Wells Ballet; Artistic Director, 1968–79 of the London Festival Ballet
 Prof Peter Jupp, former Professor of History at Queen's University Belfast
 Edmond Xavier Kapp, British artist
 Alan Keith, broadcaster who presented Your Hundred Best Tunes for 44 years
 Most Rev Alan John Knight, Archbishop of the West Indies, 1950–79
 Arnold Lynch, engineer, designed Colossus computer during World War II
 Millie Miller, Labour MP, 1974–77 for Ilford North, and Leader of Camden Council, 1971–3
 David Nabarro, co-discoverer of the causes of African trypanosomiasis (sleeping sickness) and former president of the Association of Clinical Pathologists
 Prof David Newman OBE, Professor of Political Geography and Dean of the Faculty of Humanities and Social Sciences at Ben-Gurion University of the Negev
 Prof Leslie Orgel, Professor of Chemistry 1964–2007 at the University of California, San Diego and Salk Institute for Biological Studies, known for Orgel's rule
 Sir Alan Parker, film director
 Louis van Praag, fashion designer
 Denis Richards, historian
 Andrew Rothstein, Marxist historian and journalist
 Rev Prof Ernest Gordon Rupp, Dixie Professor of Ecclesiastical History, 1968–77 at the University of Cambridge
 Jessica Tandy, Oscar-winning actress
 Geoff Travis, founder of Rough Trade Records
 Ronnie Waldman, television executive
 Tom Watt, actor

Teachers
 Alan Amos (born 1952), politician, Conservative MP for Hexham, 1987-1992 (head of the school's economics and politics department, 1976–84)
 Michael Duane (1915–1997), teacher known for his progressive views on education (taught at the school 1939–40, then in 1946)
 Dame Helen Metcalf (1946–2003), headteacher of Chiswick Community School, 1998-2001 (taught history at Dame Alice Owen's School, 1971–75)
 Reg Tricker (1904–1990), footballer who played for Arsenal (head of sports at the school)

References

Notes

Footnotes

Bibliography

Lists of people by English school affiliation